Pete Williamson (1 August 1946 – 7 July 1991) was a Canadian speed skater. He competed in two events at the 1968 Winter Olympics.

References

1946 births
1991 deaths
Canadian male speed skaters
Olympic speed skaters of Canada
Speed skaters at the 1968 Winter Olympics
Speed skaters from Winnipeg
20th-century Canadian people